The High School Affiliated to Renmin University Of China, known colloquially as Rendafuzhong (RDFZ), is the high school affiliated with Renmin University of China. RDFZ is situated in the Haidian District of Beijing, within the Zhongguancun Science and Technology Zone. RDFZ is a beacon high school accredited by the Beijing Municipal Commission of Education. The school is a member of the G30 Schools group. A 2016 Organisation for Economic Co-operation and Development (OECD) report described the school as among the most famous in China.

History 
The school was established on April 3, 1950 as the Beijing Experimental Accelerated Middle School for Workers and Farmers; though plans to create an experimental school for Beijing's growing population existed as early as January of that year. Created by the Chinese Ministry of Education, which had been formally established only a year earlier, the school was used to further develop China's education system.

In 1952, the school became affiliated with Renmin University of China and was renamed to Workers and Farmers' Accelerated Middle School Attached to Renmin University of China. In 1955, the school broadened its student population beyond workers and farmers and broadened its curriculum to include traditional high school classes. In 1956, the school was again renamed, this time to Workers' and Farmers' High School Affiliated to Renmin University of China, a name that was kept until 1960, when the name was finally changed to its current name, the High School Affiliated to Renmin University of China.

With Renmin University of China closed by the Beijing Revolutionary Committee during the Cultural Revolution in October 1970, the school briefly changed its name to Beijing Middle School No. 172. When Renmin University of China reopened in 1978, the school reaffirmed its affiliation to the university and the school's name was changed back.

A 2012 article in The New York Times alleged that the school was one of many in China to illegally accept bribes to admit students; however, this claim was denied by school officials.

Structure

Administration 
The school is one of the few high schools that are directly under the administration of China's Ministry of Education.

The school is also a branch of RDFZ United, an administrative body presiding over a number of schools internationally. Besides RDFZ, there are more than ten schools under the administration of RDFZ United. For example, High School Affiliated to Renmin University of China, Shenzhen (中国人民大学附属中学深圳分校) is a new secondary school established in 2017 in Shenzhen. RDFZ United is one of the few Chinese educational organizations that have branches located outside mainland China; Princeton International School of Mathematics and Science, created by a joint venture between Chinese investor Jiang Bairong and RDFZ, is a member of RDFZ United located in Princeton, New Jersey.

Because the growing number of schools that fall under the administration of RDFZ United, a council was created to formalize the management structure of RDFZ United. Council members are mainly officials from Renmin University of China. RUC President is an ex officio member. RDFZ United's founding principal Liu Pengzhi is the chancellor of the Council. Among others, Vice President of RUC, Dean of RUC School of Law, and Principal of RDFZ are also elected to the Council.

Staff 
The staff includes 50 special-class teachers and over 170 senior-level teachers. 16 teachers have been conferred the title of "pillar teacher" at the national level, and another 25 at the Beijing municipal level. 37 are recognized as advanced individuals in their disciplines in Haidian District. There are more than 40 foreign teachers from the United States, the United Kingdom and other countries.

Students
Foreign passport holders are allowed to attend so long as they have legal guardians residing in Beijing for the duration of their enrollment.

Academics 
RDFZ is a beacon high school accredited by the Beijing Municipal Commission of Education. In a 2016 ranking, it ranked first amongst all high schools in Mainland China. In another 2016 ranking, this time of Chinese high schools that send students to study in American universities, RDFZ ranked fifth in mainland China by number of students entering top American universities. The school is a member of the G30 Schools group. The school offers the International Baccalaureate diploma, Advanced Placement and A-Level curriculums.
RDFZ has been awarded a number of titles and awards by China's Ministry of Education and by the Beijing Municipal Commission of Education, including:

 Advanced School of All-round Education with Distinctive Characteristics
 School of Full-range Development and Talented Students' Academic Training
 Advanced School of Working Skill Education
 Municipal Model School for Education in Science and Technology
 National Model School for Modern Technology Education
 Excellent School for Training Elite Back-up Athletes
 Advanced School for Merits in Physical and Health Work
 Model School for Demonstrating Green Network
 State-level Traditional School for Physical Education

Departments
There are two academic departments in RDFZ:
 Domestic curriculum centre: offering junior high (Grade 7-9) and senior high (Grade 10-12) students domestic curriculums prescribed by the ministry of education and Beijing's department of education. The graduating students of junior high and senior high will take Zhongkao and Gaokao for senior high school and university admission respectively.  
 International curriculum centre (ICC): ICC offers foreign-bound senior high students (Grade 10-12) a variety of internationally recognised curriculums (IB, AP, and A-Level) and helps students gain admissions into international colleges (predominantly U.K., U.S., Canadian, and Australian universities).

It is notable that, not to be confused with ICC, RDFZ also has an international student office (ISO) that places foreign nationals (students holding non-PRC passports) into domestic and international curriculums.

Admissions

Junior high school
Due to the lack of standard test, junior high school admission in Beijing is usually complicated and not without controversies. Admitted junior high school students usually come from one of the following admission programs:
 Random Placement: a lottery program is administered for eligible Grade 6 students living in the school district. However, due to the merit-based nature of the school and the conceivably high level of academic demand, the quota for the lottery program is usually very small, accounting for less than 10 percent of the incoming class.
 Early Development Program (EDP): EDP is targeted to academically-gifted and precocious Grade 5 students. RDFZ administers a separate entrance exam (including Chinese, English, Math and Science). And the students go through an accelerated curriculum that will enable them graduate one year earlier than usual.
 Talent Program: students with special talent in Music, Art, Sports and Science are admitted through this program.
 Regular Placement: students are assessed by their academic and extracurricular achievements in primary school. This is the largest entrance program by the number of students.
 Feeder Schools: RDFZ also assigns special quota to its feeder schools (e.g. The Elementary School Affiliated to Renmin University of China).
 Discretionary Placement: Although never publicly confirmed and often vehemently denied by the school officials, there has been reports that RDFZ admits students with political and business ties.

Senior High School
Admitted senior high school students usually come from one of the following admission programs:
 High School Entrance Exam (Zhongkao): a majority of the senior high class is admitted based on the candidate's Zhongkao score.
 Direct Entry: Within the RDFZ system, students with perfect grades in their junior high career are offered unconditional admission to the senior high school; junior high students with less than perfect grades are sometimes offered conditional admissions (if the student can achieve a certain score in Zhongkao).
 EDP: Barring exceptional circumstance, all EDP students are offered direct entries to senior high.

University Admission Result
Since the turn of the 21st century, RDFZ has been sending the highest number of graduates to Peking University and Tsinghua University (the top 2 universities in China) in Beijing. The dominance peaked in 2009 Gaokao, when 30 percent (181/~600) of the graduating class gained admission to Peking University and Tsinghua University (compared to the 1 percent nominal admission rate in Beijing and 0.1 percent in mainland China). Some critics have attributed RDFZ's academic success to the growing disparity in education resources. However, others have argued RDFZ's trailblazing experience in liberal arts and general education is the main reason of the success.

Around 100 students of the graduating class pursue their tertiary study abroad. RDFZ is also known for sending students to Ivy League universities.

Campus 

These include the Main Campus, the First Branch Campus, the Second Branch Campus, the Xishan Campus, the Chaoyang Campus, the Beihang Fuzhong and the Zhengzhou Campus. The school has a virtual science laboratory donated by Apple Inc., an electronics classroom, a graphic design classroom, a New Dynamic English classroom, a distance learning classroom, a driving simulator and a self-service network-based laboratory. Each classroom in the school is equipped with a multimedia system.

Extracurriculars

Student government 
The students' union  serves as the school's student government and is under the authority of the Communist Youth League of China. The union is divided into several departments, each with a specific purpose. The activities department, for example, is responsible for school events including dances, concerts and competitions. Some departments, like the presidium and secretariat, have purely administrative duties. The union's editorial division is responsible for issuing the quarterly student magazine. The union also manages a service department called the Volunteer Group, whose purpose is to provide volunteer services to the neighboring Haidian District.

Student clubs 
More than two-thirds of RDFZ students are involved in extracurricular groups or clubs. Popular clubs include Model United Nations, the Debate Club, the Astronomy Club, the Art History Club, and the Bridge Club. Student artistic and athletic organizations sponsored by the school include an orchestra, a marching orchestra, a dance troupe, a martial arts group, a choir, and a gymnastics team.

Exchange program 
RDFZ has an international student exchange program stretching across four continents. Visits are arranged for students and teachers annually between RDFZ and its sister schools listed below.

Asia 

 Shanghai Datong High School, Shanghai, China
 Hou Kong Middle School, Macau, China
 Holy Trinity College, Hong Kong, China
 Fukien Secondary School, Hong Kong, China
 Daewon Foreign Language High School, Seoul, South Korea
 Hana Academy Seoul, Seoul, South Korea
 Musashi Junior and Senior High School, Tokyo, Japan
 Ikeda Senior High School Attached to Osaka Kyoiku University, Osaka, Japan
 Hagoromo Gakuen Junior College, Osaka, Japan
 Kitayodokoto School, Osaka, Japan
 School of Science and Technology, Singapore, Singapore
 Raffles Institution, Singapore
 Raffles Girls' School (Secondary), Singapore
 Mahidol University International Demonstration School, Bangkok, Thailand

Europe 

 Niels Steensens Gymnasium, Copenhagen, Denmark
 Rungsted Boarding School, Rungsted, Denmark
 Ekenäs Gymnasium, Ekenäs, Finland
 Kantonsschule am Burggraben St. Gallen, St. Gallen, Switzerland
 Ferdinand Porsche Gymnasium, Stuttgart, Germany
 Belvedere College SJ, Dublin, Ireland
 Hamelin Laie International School, Barcelona, Spain
 British Council School, Madrid, Spain
 Harrow School, Harrow, London, United Kingdom
 Eton College, Eton, Berkshire, United Kingdom
 The Emmbrook School, Wokingham, Berkshire, United Kingdom
 The Holt School, Wokingham, Berkshire, United Kingdom
 The Piggott School, Wargrave, Berkshire, United Kingdom
 Wellington College, Crowthorne, Berkshire, United Kingdom

Americas 

 Phillips Andover Academy, Andover, Massachusetts, United States
 Phillips Exeter Academy, Exeter, New Hampshire, United States
 Punahou School, Honolulu, Hawaii, United States
 Georgetown Day School, Washington, D.C., United States
 Thomas Jefferson High School for Science and Technology, Fairfax County, Virginia, United States
 Illinois Mathematics and Science Academy, Aurora, Illinois, United States

 Tabor Academy, Marion, Massachusetts, United States

Oceania 

 Trinity Grammar School, Sydney, Australia

Notable alumni 

 Hao Jianxiu – CPPCC Vice Chairman 
 Han Xu – Chinese Ambassador to the United States 
 Song Demin – CPPCC Chief Secretary 
 Liu Zheng – CPPCC Vice Chief Secretary 
 Wei Jingsheng – human rights activist
 Dai Wei – founder of Ofo
 Liu Qing – president of Didi Chuxing
 Cheng Congfu – racing driver
 Hou Yifan – Chinese chess grandmaster
 Zhang Peimeng – track and field sprinter
 Yang Peiyi – teenage singer
 Zhang Nuanxin – film director
 Chloé Zhao - film director
 Xu Qing - actress

Alumni Associations
The school has two alumni associations:
 Mainland Alumni Association, targeting alumni living in China (predominantly in Beijing), is headquartered in the Main Campus.
 International Alumni Association, targeting members of the RDFZ diaspora outside of Mainland China, is founded in Harvard University in Cambridge, Massachusetts in 2008. The New York branch holds annual functions in spring.

In Popular Culture
RDFZ Students, rightfully or wrongly, have been associated with privilege and elitism. RDFZ Students are known for their high school spirit. Students/Alumni wearing school uniforms have been spotted in university campuses, shopping malls, and around the globe. On Chinese social media platforms, students have been "caricatured" as wearing their uniforms while showering.

CCTV has released a documentary series about Gaokao. One episode focused on a RDFZ student who was applying to American universities.

References

Notes

References

External links

 
  

High schools in Beijing
Renmin University of China
Renmin University
Zhongguancun
Educational institutions established in 1950
1950 establishments in China
Schools in Haidian District
Round Square schools